Pterolophia quadrituberculata is a species of beetle in the family Cerambycidae. It was described by Stephan von Breuning and de Jong in 1941. It is endemic to Indonesia.

References

quadrituberculata
Beetles described in 1941
Endemic fauna of Indonesia
Taxa named by Stephan von Breuning (entomologist)